Aaron Joshua Nesmith (born October 16, 1999) is an American professional basketball player for the Indiana Pacers of the National Basketball Association (NBA). He played college basketball for the Vanderbilt Commodores.

Early life and high school career
Nesmith attended Porter-Gaud School in Charleston, South Carolina beginning in the fifth grade and was first called up to the varsity basketball team as an eighth-grader. As a sophomore, he won the South Carolina Independent School Association (SCISA) Class 3A state title as his team's leading scorer. Nesmith led Porter-Gaud to two more Class 3A state championships in his final two seasons. As a senior, he averaged 21 points, 4.5 rebounds, and 1.8 assists per game and was named South Carolina Gatorade Player of the Year for his success in basketball and academics. He left high school as a three-time SCISA Class 3A player of the year.
Nesmith was a four star recruit in high school and was the 64th ranked player in the country, the 12th ranked shooting guard in the country, and 2nd ranked in all of South Carolina. Nesmith would end up committing to Vanderbilt on 9/19/2017.

Nesmith did not receive offers from any high major NCAA Division I programs until he was a senior, but he began drawing more attention after an Amateur Athletic Union (AAU) tournament in Charlotte, North Carolina. He was rated a four-star recruit by ESPN and 247Sports and committed to Vanderbilt over offers from Florida, South Carolina, Harvard, Virginia Tech, and Columbia.

College career
In his freshman season for Vanderbilt, Nesmith assumed an important role after Darius Garland suffered a season-ending injury and Simisola Shittu underachieved. He started in a majority of his games and averaged 11 points and 5.5 rebounds per game, leading the Commodores in scoring in conference play. On February 18, 2019, Nesmith was named Southeastern Conference (SEC) Freshman of the Week following two career games. He scored a season-high 26 points against Florida and posted a double-double of 24 points and a season-high 14 rebounds against Auburn.

Nesmith made his sophomore season debut on November 6, 2019, scoring 25 points, including seven three-pointers, in a win over Southeast Missouri State. In the following week, he scored a career-high 34 points, hitting seven three-pointers, in an overtime loss to Richmond. Nesmith made four straight threes in a span of only one minute and 39 seconds. On December 6, Nesmith was named to the Oscar Robertson Trophy watch list. On December 21, he matched his career-high of 34 points and connected on seven three-pointers in a victory over UNC Wilmington. Nesmith scored 29 points and made eight three-pointers, the best mark of his career, on January 4, 2020, as his team lost to SMU in overtime. On January 11, 2020, it was initially announced that Nesmith would miss the remainder of the season with a right foot injury that he suffered in a loss to Auburn. In 14 games, he averaged 23 points and 4.9 rebounds per game, shooting 52.2 percent from three-point range. Nesmith was the fifth-leading scorer in the NCAA Division I and averaged the most points by a Vanderbilt player since Tom Hagan in the 1968–1969 season. He had been on pace to have one of the best three-point shooting seasons in college basketball history. However, after having surgery on January 28, Nesmith indicated that he might return before the end of the season. Nesmith did not return, and after the end of the season declared for the 2020 NBA draft.

Professional career

Boston Celtics (2020–2022)
Nesmith was selected with the 14th pick in the first round of the 2020 NBA draft by the Boston Celtics. On November 24, 2020, the Boston Celtics signed Nesmith to a four-year, $16.5 million rookie contract including team options in the third and fourth year. With fellow rookie teammate, Payton Pritchard, absorbing many of injured Kemba Walker's minutes, it was difficult for Nesmith to crack the regular rotation for the first few months of the season. With injuries and Covid protocols plaguing the Celtics all season, extended absences from Marcus Smart, Kemba Walker, and other key players gave Nesmith enough opportunities to showcase not only his shooting capabilities, but also his gritty hustle and winning attitude. By April 23, 2021, coach Brad Stevens had seen enough from the rookie to warrant consistent rotation playing time to which he hovered around 20 minutes per game for the rest of the regular season. On April 28, 2021, Nesmith put on a show with multiple career highs including 15 points, 9 rebounds, three steals, and three blocks in a winning effort against the Charlotte Hornets. He continued this momentum into the next two games where he eclipsed, and then matched his then career high with back to back 16 point performances.

He played for the Celtics in the 2021 NBA summer league. On February 15, 2022, Nesmith recorded his Celtic career-high with 18 points in a win over the Philadelphia 76ers. In his second season, Nesmith and the Celtics reached the 2022 NBA Finals and lost in 6 games to the Golden State Warriors.

Indiana Pacers (2022–present) 
On July 9, 2022, Nesmith was traded, alongside Daniel Theis, Malik Fitts, Juwan Morgan, Nik Stauskas and a 2023 first-round pick, to the Indiana Pacers in exchange for Malcolm Brogdon. On November 19, Nesmith scored 19 points on 5–8 three-point shooting, while making two game-winning free throws with 9.6 seconds remaining, to defeat the Orlando Magic 114–113. On December 18, he posted new career-highs with 23 points and 10 rebounds in a loss to the New York Knicks. On December 21, in a win over his former team, Nesmith recorded 15 points and six rebounds as a starter, defeating the Celtics 117–112.

Career statistics

NBA

Regular season

|-
| style="text-align:left;"| 2020–21
| style="text-align:left;"| Boston
| 46 || 1 || 14.5 || .438 || .370 || .786 || 2.8 || .5 || .3 || .2 || 4.7
|-
| style="text-align:left;"| 2021–22
| style="text-align:left;"| Boston
| 52 || 3 || 11.0 || .396 || .270 || .808 || 1.7 || .4 || .4 || .1 || 3.8
|- class="sortbottom"
| style="text-align:center;" colspan="2"| Career
| 98 || 4 || 12.7 || .417 || .318 || .796 || 2.2 || .5 || .4 || .1 || 4.2

Playoffs

|-
| style="text-align:left;"| 2021
| style="text-align:left;"| Boston
| 5 || 0 || 15.0 || .278 || .286 || 1.000 || 2.6 || .2 || .2 || .2 || 3.2
|-
| style="text-align:left;"| 2022
| style="text-align:left;"| Boston
| 15 || 0 || 3.5 || .235 || .091 || .750 || 1.0 || .2 || .1 || .3 || .8
|- class="sortbottom"
| style="text-align:center;" colspan="2"| Career
| 20 || 0 || 6.4 || .257 || .200 || .833 || 1.4 || .2 || .2 || .3 || 1.4

College

|-
| style="text-align:left;"| 2018–19
| style="text-align:left;"| Vanderbilt
| 32 || 19 || 29.0 || .392 || .337 || .825 || 5.5 || 1.4 || .7 || .6 || 11.0
|-
| style="text-align:left;"| 2019–20
| style="text-align:left;"| Vanderbilt
| 14 || 14 || 35.7 || .512 || .522 || .825 || 4.9 || .9 || 1.4 || .9 || 23.0
|- class="sortbottom"
| style="text-align:center;" colspan="2"| Career
| 46 || 33 || 31.0 || .442 || .410 || .825 || 5.3 || 1.3 || .9 || .7 || 14.7

References

External links
Vanderbilt Commodores bio

1999 births
Living people
American men's basketball players
Basketball players from South Carolina
Boston Celtics draft picks
Boston Celtics players
Indiana Pacers players
Maine Celtics players
Small forwards
Sportspeople from Charleston, South Carolina
Vanderbilt Commodores men's basketball players